Mangal Bagh (1973 – 28 January 2021), also known as Mangal Bagh Afridi, was the leader of Lashkar-e-Islam, a militant group operating in Pakistan and Afghanistan. He was killed in a roadside bomb attack in Nangarhar, Afghanistan on 28 January 2021.

Personal life
Bagh was from the Bara Tehsil, and belonged to the Sepah Afridi tribe. In his youth, he was ideologically affiliated with the Awami National Party (ANP) and used to wash cars at a taxi stand in Peshawar. Bagh then became a conductor of a bus operating between Bara and Peshawar and later became its driver.

Bagh was not very educated as he attended only primary school in his native town.

Militant activity
Bagh was said to be a successor of Mufti Munir Shakir, a Deobandi cleric who established a pirate radio station in Khyber Agency in 2004 after being ejected from Kurram Agency by tribal elders for inciting sectarian hostility. When Shakir was ejected from Khyber Agency, he turned over his radio station to Bagh, a local driver, and Bagh then also led the militant group Lashkar-e-Islam.

Bagh-led Lashkar-e-Islam allied itself with Tehreek-e Taliban Pakistan (TTP). In 2008, Bagh and his militant group retreated to Afghanistan following a series of military operations conducted by the Pakistan army in Bara and later Tirah valley.

During his stay in Afghanistan, Lashkar-e-Islam allied itself with Islamic State of Iraq and the Levant (ISIS). In 2016, an Afghan news outlet, Pajhwok News reported that Lashkar-e-Islam was gaining strength in Nangarhar after they allied themselves with ISIS. Nangarhar intelligence chief Maj. Gen. Dad Mohammad Harifi, however, said they had no evidence to prove if Mangal Bagh-led militants had ever attacked Afghan security posts in Nangarhar.

Afghan Taliban sources said Mangal Bagh had once joined forces with the Afghan government-backed militia known as Arbaki to fight the Afghan Taliban in Nangarhar province.

Death 
Bagh was killed in a roadside bomb attack in Nangarhar, Afghanistan on 28 January 2021. No group or individual took responsibility for assassinating Bagh. Bagh's death was confirmed by Nangarhar's Governor Zia-ul-Haq Amarkhel.

His funeral was offered in Achin District, Afghanistan. A few of Bagh's close associates attended his funeral.

Previous reports of death
On 22 July 2016, Mangal Bagh was reported to have been killed in a drone attack in Nangarhar province, Afghanistan.

However, in May 2017, Inter-Services Public Relations tacitly admitted that reports of Bagh's death were false when they announced that Pakistani forces conducted an operation in Khyber Agency, killing several militants after receiving a tip-off relating to the presence of Bagh.

Reports of Bagh's death were proven false when the United States added Bagh to the U.S. State Department's Rewards for Justice wanted list on March 7, 2018.

References

1973 births
2021 deaths
Terrorism in Pakistan
Tehrik-i-Taliban Pakistan members
Pashtun people
People from Khyber District
Leaders of Islamic terror groups